"The 30% Iron Chef" is the 22nd episode and final episode in season three of Futurama. It originally aired on the Fox network in the United States on April 14, 2002. Bender aspires to be a cook for the Planet Express crew, but the meals he produces are awful. One day, Bender overhears the crew complaining about one of his meals and is overcome by feelings of worthlessness and self-pity.

Plot
Bender aspires to be a cook for the Planet Express crew, but the meals he produces are awful. One day, Bender overhears the crew complaining about one of his meals and is overcome by feelings of worthlessness and self-pity. After running away, Bender asks Elzar to teach him how to cook, but Elzar refuses. Bender then becomes a hobo and travels to the "biggest hobo joint in the universe". There he meets Helmut Spargel, a legendary cook who lost his TV show when a young, upcoming Elzar replaced him.

Spargel trains Bender how to cook in order to get revenge on Elzar. As a final test, Spargel challenges Bender to cook an edible meal. Spargel tries the food and tells Bender that it is "acceptable". As a result of eating the food, his stomach explodes, and he dies. With his dying breath, Spargel reveals the secret to perfect cooking: a vial of unknown liquid ("the essence of pure flavour") to use whenever he needs to spice up a food. To avenge Spargel, Bender challenges Elzar to a cook-off on the TV show "Iron Cook" (a parody of Iron Chef). The main ingredient used in this cook-off is Soylent Green. Bender prepares terrible looking food, but applies the liquid that Spargel gave him and wins. As the loser, Elzar is forced to wash the dishes.

When the Professor examines the liquid in the bottle Spargel gave Bender, it turns out the liquid is ordinary water. Fry says that all Spargel gave Bender was confidence, before the Professor adds that the water was laced with trace amounts of LSD. Bender then proposes a meal for his co-workers, who are unsure, but joyfully accept when Bender adds that the meal will include plenty of "confidence".

Meanwhile, Zoidberg accidentally destroys a scale replica of the universe's largest bottle that Professor Farnsworth has just made. He frames Fry for the damage and the Professor demands that Fry pay $10 for the material cost. Zoidberg is riddled with guilt as Fry is easily persuaded to make the payment, not having the wherewithal to defend himself. During the contest, Fry is unable to pay for a commemorative turkey baster, having given the Professor his last $10. Zoidberg's guilt becomes unbearable, and he publicly apologizes for framing Fry before trying to commit seppuku using the Chairman's ceremonial Wakizashi. Instead, his hard shell damages the $5000 sword, and he quickly accuses Fry before running away.

Broadcast and reception
In its initial airing, the episode received a Nielsen rating of 3.0/6, placing it 90th among primetime shows for the week of April 8–15, 2002. The A.V. Club gave the episode a B.

References

External links
 The 30% Iron Chef at The Infosphere.
 

Futurama (season 3) episodes
2002 American television episodes
Iron Chef

fr:Le Chef de fer à 30%